Shree Saini (born January 6, 1996) is an American model and beauty pageant titleholder of Indian descent. She represented the United States at Miss World 2021, placing 1st runner-up and winning the Beauty with a Purpose National Ambassadorship.

Early life
Shree Saini was born on January 6, 1996, in Punjab, India, and has lived in the United States since age 5. During her childhood, Saini witnessed poverty and since then, advocates that everyone take upon themselves a social responsibility to give back.

For the first 12 years of her life, while growing up in Moses Lake, Washington, Saini's heartbeat had an average of just 20 beats per minute. Doctors told her she could never dance again but she persisted and practiced extra hours for years so she could dance again.

Later in life Saini was involved in a major car crash in Moses Lake that resulted in her suffering from significant facial burns. Saini was advised that her recovery would take a year, but she returned to her classes after just two weeks.

Education
Saini has been a non-degree visiting student at Harvard, Yale, and Stanford University extension programs, later earning her undergrad at the University of Washington. She is a trained ballerina, and has been accepted to train at Joffrey Ballet.

Pageantry
Saini, who was listed as both a resident of Seattle and Ellensburg, Washington, in 2020, is the 2020 Miss Washington World and America's Beauty with a Purpose National Ambassador, which is a preliminary competition to Miss World America and Miss World. In October 2019, Saini collapsed at the Miss World America preliminary. In 2020, Saini was also a World Peace Messenger award recipient from Passion Vista. On October 2, 2021, Shree Saini was appointed Miss World America 2021, and crowned by Diana Hayden, Miss World 1997. Shree Saini would go on to represent the United States of America at Miss World 2021 in Puerto Rico.

Miss World 2021 
Saini finished as the first runner up in the Miss World 2021 competition, where Karolina Bielawska of Poland was crowned as the winner. She was also chosen as the Beauty with a Purpose Ambassador and will travel with Bielawska.

Miss World America 2021
Shree Saini becomes the first Indian-American to hold the Miss World America title.

Miss World America 2020
Miss World America's Beauty with a Purpose National Ambassador
Beauty with a Purpose finalist
Top Influencer National Winner
 People's Choice National Winner
 Talent finalist
 Talent Audience Choice

References

External links
 

Living people
American people of Punjabi descent
American female models of Indian descent
American beauty pageant contestants
American beauty pageant winners
1996 births
People from Ellensburg, Washington
People from Seattle
People from Moses Lake, Washington
Miss World 2021 delegates
Indian emigrants to the United States
Beauty pageant contestants